Ərəş is a village and municipality in the Yevlakh Rayon of Azerbaijan.  It has a population of 1,908.

References 

Populated places in Yevlakh District